Akhmed and variant Akhmad may refer to:
Ağəməd, Azerbaijan
Akhmed Avtorkhanov, Chechen leader
Akhmed Aziz, Guantanamo internee
Akhmad Kadyrov, First President of the Chechen Republic
Akhmed Zakayev, Prime Minister of the Chechen Republic

See also
Ahmed
Ali Taziev, also known as Akhmed Yevloyev, Ingush separatist